George L. Priest (born November 24, 1947) is an American legal scholar specializing in antitrust law.  Priest has taught at the Yale Law School since 1981, where he is the Edward J. Phelps Professor of Law and Economics and Director of the John M. Olin Center for Law, Economics, and Public Policy. Priest is a noted antitrust scholar, and is also the author of a wide number of articles and monographs on the subjects of product liability, tort law, insurance litigation, and settlement. Among his students at Yale was journalist Emily Bazelon.

Background 
Priest is a graduate of Yale University and the University of Chicago Law School. After graduation and prior to Yale, he worked at the University of Chicago, University at Buffalo, and UCLA. He is the father of fellow Yale Law School professor Claire Priest, Doctor of Evolutionary Biology Nicholas Priest and a son-in-law of Adolph Kiefer, a 1936 Olympics champion. He is also a member and longtime sponsor of Yale's chapter of the Federalist Society.

Works
The Common Law Process and the Selection of Efficient Rules (1977)
The Selection of Disputes for Litigation (1984)
My Greatest Benefactions (1986)
Satisfying the Multiple Goals of Tort Law (1988)
Rethinking Antitrust Law in an Age of Network Industries (2007)
Ronald Coase, Firms and Markets (2014)
The Rise of Law and Economics: An Intellectual History (2020)

References

External links
Yale Law School faculty profile

Scholars of competition law
Living people
American non-fiction writers
American lawyers
Yale University alumni
University of Chicago alumni
University at Buffalo faculty
University of California, Los Angeles faculty
University of Chicago faculty
Yale Law School faculty
Federalist Society members
Law and economics scholars
1947 births